= Society of honor =

Society of honor may refer to:

- Honor society, a rank organization that recognizes excellence among peers
- A culture of honor (see Honour § Cultures of honour and cultures of law)
